Bummer (stylised in uppercase) is the debut studio album by Canadian rock duo Cleopatrick. It was released on 4 June 2021 via Nowhere Special Recordings.

Release 
The first single "Good Grief" was released on 11 December 2020, alongside its accompanying music video. Gruntz said the song "marks a new era for our band". This was followed by second single "The Drake" on 11 March 2021, which Gruntz says was written about "assholes from our hometown".

The third single "Family Van" was released on 20 April 2021, alongside the announcement of the album, and an online video game themed with the song. About the song, Gruntz said "I wrote Family Van after a band ripped one of our songs off. They were bigger than us and we felt powerless." An official PowerPoint Presentation was released too, before the music video on May 11. The song went onto peak at No. 32 on the US Mainstream Rock Charts, and at No. 45 in the Canadian Rock Charts.

The final single "2008" was released on 19 May 2021, along with its music video. Gruntz described it as the "most honest moment on the album", and the "most vulnerable Cleopatrick song […] and the song that means the most to me out of anything I've written". After the album's released, they band also released a music video for "Victoria Park".

Reception 
Bummer received generally positive reviews from music critics. Exclaim! praised the album's "excellent grooves", "unique energy" and "plenty of pounding, cathartic moments throughout", while Kerrang! praised the bands "titanic riffs", although criticised the way "the songs seem to meld into one another".
Metacritic assigned the album 72/100, based on five reviews.

Track listing 
Notes

 All track titles are stylised in uppercase.

Charts

Personnel

Cleopatrick 

 Luke Gruntz - vocals, guitar, production
 Ian Fraser - drums, production

Other personnel 

 Jig Dubé – production
 Spencer Sunshine – engineering
 Jon Wayne - mixing
 Greg Calbi - mastering
 Steve Fallone - mastering

References 

2021 albums
Cleopatrick albums